Ghana competed at the 2011 World Aquatics Championships in Shanghai, China between July 16 and 31, 2011.

Because the Ghana Olympic Committee is suspended by the International Olympic Committee, Ghanaian athletes participated as Athletes from Ghana under the flag of FINA.

Swimming

Ghana qualified 1 swimmer.

Women

References

Nations at the 2011 World Aquatics Championships
2011
World Aquatics Championships